"Pretty Good Year" is a song by American singer-songwriter Tori Amos, taken from her second album, Under the Pink (1994). It was released as the second single from the album in the United Kingdom on March 7, 1994, and as the fourth single in Australia on November 7, 1994. It was not released in North America. "Pretty Good Year" became Amos's second single to reach the top 10 on the UK Singles Chart, where it peaked at number seven.

Track listings
UK 7-inch vinyl
A. "Pretty Good Year"
B. "Honey"

UK CD1
 "Pretty Good Year" – 3:26
 "Home on the Range" (with Cherokee addition) – 5:24
 "Daisy Dead Petals" – 3:02

UK CD2 and Australian CD single
 "Pretty Good Year" – 3:25
 "Honey" – 3:47
 "Black Swan" – 4:04

Credits and personnel
Credits are adapted from the Under the Pink album booklet.

Studios
 Recorded at The Fishhouse (New Mexico, US)
 Strings recorded at Westlake Studios (Los Angeles)
 Mixed at Olympic Studios (London, England)
 Mastered at Gateway Mastering (Portland, Maine, US)

Personnel

 Tori Amos – writing, vocals, piano, production
 John Philip Shenale – string arrangement
 Scott Smalley – conducting
 Ezra Kliger – violin
 Nancy Roth – violin
 John Wittenberg – violin
 Francine Walsh – violin
 Michael Harrison – violin
 Chris Reutinger – violin
 Jimbo Ross – viola
 Cynthia Morrow – viola

 John Acevedo – viola
 Nancy Stein-Ross – cello
 Dane Little – cello
 Melissa Hasin – cello
 Dominic Genova – double bass
 George Porter Jr. – "hanging out"
 Carlo Nuccio – "hanging out"
 Eric Rosse – production, programming
 John Beverly Jones – recording
 Kevin Killen – mixing
 Bob Ludwig – mastering

Charts

Release history

References

Tori Amos songs
1994 singles
1994 songs
East West Records singles
Song recordings produced by Eric Rosse
Songs written by Tori Amos